Ramón Ramírez may refer to:

Ramón Ramírez (footballer) (born 1969), retired Mexican football (soccer) player
Ramón Ramírez (Panamanian pitcher) (born 1977), Panamanian professional baseball pitcher
Ramón Ramírez (Dominican pitcher) (born 1981), Dominican professional baseball pitcher 
Ramón Ramírez (Venezuelan pitcher) (born 1982), Venezuelan professional baseball pitcher 
Ramón Antonio Ramírez, Dominican politician and businessman